South Vietnamese military ranks and insignia was used by the Republic of Vietnam Military Forces, specifically the Army, Navy, Marines and Air Force. Originally based on French ranks, the ranks were changed in 1967 to resemble US ranks more closely.

Commissioned officer ranks
The rank insignia of commissioned officers.

Other ranks
The rank insignia of non-commissioned officers and enlisted personnel.

References

External links
 

South Vietnam